Smpad Piurad (March 3, 1862 – 1915) was an Armenian intellectual, writer and public activist. He was murdered during the Armenian genocide.

Life 
Smpad Piurad was born Smpad Der-Ghazarian in Süleymanlı/Zeitun on 3 March 1862. In 1871, he went to Jerusalem where he attended and ultimately graduated from the Jarankavorats school in 1880. In 1880 he began studying at Sorbonne University. In 1885 he became the common revisor of the 36 Armenian schools of Cilicia. During this period he published his first poems in Yeghia Demirjibashian's philosophical journal "Yergrakount" (Earth).

In 1885, Piurad opens a school in the Armenian populated village of Sis (today Kozan).

Being a political activist, he was arrested along with his wife (who became blind in Turkish prison) and spent 5 years in prison, in Marash and Aleppo. In a letter written by the Armenians of Zeytun to William Gladstone, Prime Minister of Great Britain, describes the arrest and treatment of Piurad while in prison:

In 1895 he was released and moved to Cairo, where he founded the Armenian Central College and Nor Or newspaper.
After the Young Turk Revolution, he returned to Turkey, where he edited the Pyunik and Gaghapar newspapers and collaborated with Ottoman Turkish newspapers. He also wrote a large number of works (from "Yeldiz to Sassoun", 1910; "The Eagle of Avarair", 1909; "For the Freedom", 1911; etc.) and opened a publishing house. He was elected as a national deputy.

Death 
Piurad was arrested on April 24, 1915 and deported along with other Armenian intellectuals, imprisoned in Ayaş, and ultimately killed in Ankara.

Writing style 
Piurad is considered a late-romantic writer. The theme adopted in much of his writings are largely centered around the persecution of the Armenian race by the government, heroic tales, and dramatic depiction of Armenian revolutionary life. The settings of some of his novels were set in his native land of Zeytun. His striking depiction of the revolutionary movement drew large attention for Armenian readers making him a very popular writer in the early 20th century.

Works 
Some of Piurads literary works included:
 Panasdeghtsagan Yerker Vol. 1. (Constantinople, 1909). (Poetry).
 Avarayri Aruytse gam Vardanank. (Constantinople, 1909). (Play).
 Veghavor Herose gam Bartoghomeos and Takachian. (Constantinople, 1909).
 Zeytuntsi Vardapete. (N.p., c1910)
 Innsun vets: Arevni mechen. 6 vols. (Constantinople, 1911). (Novel).
 Sasunen Yetke. 1. Diakaputnere. (Constantinople, 1911). (Novel).
 Sasunen Yetke. 2. Tebi Yeltez. (Constantinople, 1911). (Novel).
 Pande pant. 5 vols. (Constantinople, 1910). (Novel).
 Verchin berde. (Constantinople, 1914). (Drama).
 Aryuni Dzore. (Published posthumously: Constantinople, 1919). (Story).

Legacy 
In Armenia, an elementary school is named after him.

See also
Armenian notables deported from the Ottoman capital in 1915

References

External links 
 School № 125 named after Smbat Byurat 
 Byurat's biography

Armenian-language writers
People who died in the Armenian genocide
Armenians from the Ottoman Empire
1862 births
1915 deaths
University of Paris alumni
19th-century writers from the Ottoman Empire
20th-century writers from the Ottoman Empire
Prisoners and detainees of the Ottoman Empire
People from Süleymanlı